Gastrotheca bufona (common name: Antioquia marsupial frog) is a species of frog in the family Hemiphractidae. It is endemic to Colombia and known from the Cordillera Central and Cordillera Occidental in Antioquia and Caldas Departments, at elevations of  asl. The specific name bufona is derived from Spanish bufón, meaning a jester or clown, and refers to the frog's "gaudy" appearance.

Description
The holotype, an adult male, measured  in snout–vent length. The upper eyelids bear characteristic "horns", triangular fleshy appendages. Also the heels have well-developed dermal appendages. Body is somewhat elongate. Skin of upper parts of the body is coarse and glandular.

Habitat and conservation
The natural habitat of Gastrotheca bufona is primary Andean cloud forest. It lives in the canopy. It is a rare species threatened by habitat loss caused by agriculture and logging.

References

bufona
Amphibians of the Andes
Amphibians of Colombia
Endemic fauna of Colombia
Frogs of South America
Endangered fauna of South America
Taxa named by Doris Mable Cochran
Taxonomy articles created by Polbot
Amphibians described in 1970